"Chicken Shack Boogie" is a 1948 jump-boogie song by the West Coast blues artist Amos Milburn. It was the first of four number-one hits on the R&B chart by Milburn. It was the B-side of a 78-RPM single, the A-side of which, "It Took a Long, Long Time", reached number nine on the same chart.

In 1956, Milburn released "Chicken Shack", a faster rock-and-roll version (subsequently included on his 1957 album Let's Have a Party). This version runs about 2:30 and is sometimes titled "Chicken Shack Boogie" on later compilation albums. Earl Palmer was the drummer on this version.

References

1948 singles
Blues songs
1948 songs
Aladdin Records singles